In mathematics, Lie algebra cohomology is a cohomology theory for Lie algebras. It was first introduced in 1929 by Élie Cartan to study the topology of Lie groups and homogeneous spaces by relating cohomological methods of Georges de Rham to properties of the Lie algebra.

Motivation
If  is a compact simply connected Lie group, then it is determined by its Lie algebra, so it should be possible to calculate its cohomology from the Lie algebra. This can be done as follows. Using an averaging process, this complex can be replaced by the complex of left-invariant differential forms. The left-invariant forms, meanwhile, are determined by their values at the identity, so that the space of left-invariant differential forms can be identified with the exterior algebra of the Lie algebra, with a suitable differential.

The construction of this differential on an exterior algebra makes sense for any Lie algebra, so it is used to define Lie algebra cohomology for all Lie algebras. More generally one uses a similar construction to define Lie algebra cohomology with coefficients in a module.

The reason for this is that the passage from the complex of all differential forms to the complex of left-invariant differential forms uses an averaging process that only makes sense for compact groups.

Definition

(see Ext functor for the definition of Ext). Equivalently, these are the right derived functors of the left exact invariant submodule functor

Analogously, one can define Lie algebra homology as

(see Tor functor for the definition of Tor), which is equivalent to the left derived functors of the right exact coinvariants functor

Some important basic results about the cohomology of Lie algebras include Whitehead's lemmas, Weyl's theorem, and the Levi decomposition theorem.

Chevalley–Eilenberg complex

Let  be a Lie algebra over a field , with a left action on the -module . The elements of the Chevalley–Eilenberg complex
 

The Lie bracket  on  induces a transpose application  by duality. It follows from the Jacobi identity that  satisfies  and is in fact a differential. In this setting,  is viewed as a trivial -module while  may be thought of as constants.

Explicitly, the differential of the -cochain  is the -cochain  given by:

where the caret signifies omitting that argument.

Cohomology in small dimensions
The zeroth cohomology group is (by definition) the invariants of the Lie algebra acting on the module:

The first cohomology group is the space  of derivations  modulo the space  of inner derivations
,
where a derivation is a map  from the Lie algebra to  such that

and is called inner if it is given by 

The second cohomology group 

is the space of equivalence classes of Lie algebra extensions

of the Lie algebra by the module .

A Lie -algebra is a homotopy Lie algebra with nonzero terms only in degrees 0 through .

Examples

Cohomology on the trivial module 
When , as mentioned earlier the Chevalley–Eilenberg complex coincides with the de-Rham complex for a corresponding compact Lie group.

If , as is the case for simple Lie algebras, then , so the space of derivations is trivial, so the first cohomology is trivial. 
If  is abelian, that is, then any linear functional  is in fact a derivation, and the set of inner derivations is trivial as they satisfy  for any . In light of the de-Rham correspondence, this shows the importance of the compact assumption, as this is the first cohomology group of the -torus viewed as an abelian group, and  can also be viewed as an abelian group of dimension , but  has trivial cohomology.
 Second cohomology: The second cohomology group is the space of equivalence classes of central extensions

Finite dimensional, simple Lie algebras only have trivial central extensions: a proof is provided here.

Cohomology on the adjoint module 
When , the action is the adjoint action, .

 The zeroth cohomology group is the center 
For  finite-dimensional, this is trivial.

See also
 BRST formalism in theoretical physics.
 Gelfand–Fuks cohomology

References

External links
 

Cohomology theories
Homological algebra
Lie algebras